Segundas Partes Tambien Son Buenas ("Sequels are also good") is a 2002 album by Franco De Vita released on the Universal label. This was De Vita's only release for the company. On the CD, he re-recorded several of his earlier hits using different Latin music styles. The disc featured De Vita's first officially released recording of "Vuelve," a song he wrote that became a major hit for Ricky Martin. One new song, "Como Decirte No," was a hit on the Billboard Latin music charts for De Vita.

Track listing
 Promesas
 Palabras del corazón
 Vuelve
 Louis
 Latino
 Como decirte no
 Aún Vivo
 Lo que espero de ti
 Sexo
 No hace falta decirlo
 Como apartarte de Mí
 Cómo decirte no (Pop Latino)

2002 albums
Franco De Vita albums